The Aegon GB Pro-Series Bath is a tennis tournament held in Bath, England since 2011. The event is currently part of the ITF Women's World Tennis Tour and is played on indoor hardcourts. 2011 and 2012 it was part of the ATP Challenger Tour.

Past finals

Men's singles

Men's doubles

Women's singles

Women's doubles

References

External links
LTA Site

 
ATP Challenger Tour
ITF Women's World Tennis Tour
Tennis tournaments in England
Hard court tennis tournaments
Recurring sporting events established in 2011
Recurring sporting events disestablished in 2015
Defunct tennis tournaments in the United Kingdom
2011 establishments in England
2015 disestablishments in England
Sport in Bath, Somerset